Teeple Architects is an architecture firm based in Toronto, Ontario founded by Stephen Teeple, in the year 1989. The firm is known to design several buildings in Canada.

Selected projects
Teeple’s works include 60 Richmond Street East Housing Co-operative in Toronto, completed in 2010. Writing about the project in No Mean City, Canadian architecture critic Alex Bozikovic remarks, “It has the gutsy but practical spirit of Toronto's best architecture: It's green, hardy, and very inexpensive, and provides 85 large and comfortable apartments for Toronto Community Housing tenants.” In 2015, the studio completed the Philip J. Currie Dinosaur Museum, which features an unusual geometric form resembling a dinosaur with skin and bones in Wembley, Alberta. In 2018, Stephen Teeple received an Honorary Degree from Trent University for adding four buildings to Symons Campus, including the triangular, 34,000-square-foot Student Centre.

Education 

University of Toronto Graduate House (with Thom Mayne), Toronto, Ontario, 2000
Albert Thornbrough Engineering Building, College of Physical and Engineering Science (CPES), University of Guelph, Guelph, Ontario, 2000
North Campus Building, University of Western Ontario (with aTRM Architects), London, Ontario, 2000
Early Learning Centre, Toronto, Ontario, 2003
Arnie Lowenberger Residence, Brock University, St. Catharines, Ontario, 2003
Chemical Science Building, Trent University, Peterborough, Ontario, 2004
Langara College Library and Classroom Building (with Hancock Bruckner Eng + Wright Architect), Vancouver, British Columbia, 2007
Langara Student Union Building and Academic Building C (with IBI-HB Architects), Vancouver, British Columbia, 2008
Durham College Student Services Expansion, Oshawa, Ontario, 2010
Sadlon Centre for Health and Wellness (with aTRM Architects, Ted Handy and Associates), Georgian College, Barrie, Ontario, 2011
Stephen Hawking Centre at Perimeter Institute, Waterloo, Ontario, 2011
Concert hall at University of Manitoba
Morgan State University Calvin and Tina Tyler Hall (with GWWO Architects), Baltimore, Maryland, 2020 [22]

Civic 

Toronto Public Library – Humber Bay Library renovation, Toronto, Ontario, 1996
Toronto Public Library – Bendale Library renovation, Toronto, Ontario, 1999
Toronto Public Library – Eatonville Library reconstruction, Toronto, Ontario, 2001
Ajax Main Central Library, Ajax, Ontario, 2002
Beausoleil First Nation Community Centre, Christian Island, Ontario, 2006
Montrose Cultural Centre (with Kasian Architecture), Grand Prairie, Alberta, 2009 
Sherbourne Common Pavilion, Toronto, Ontario, 2011 
John M. Harper Library and Stork Family YMCA, Waterloo, Ontario, 2011
GO Pedestrian Bridge, Pickering, Ontario, 2012
Art Gallery of Grand Prairie, Grand Prairie, Alberta, 2012
Philip J. Currie Dinosaur Museum (with ATB Architects, Reich+Petch), Wembley, Alberta, 2012
Clareview Recreation Centre and Branch Library, Edmonton, Alberta, 2013

Religious 
Scarborough Chinese Baptist Church, Toronto, Ontario, 2007 
Sisters of St. Joseph Motherhouse, Peterborough, Ontario, 2009

Residential 

Heathdale House, Toronto, Ontario, 2004
Pachter Residence, Toronto, Ontario, 2005
60 Richmond Street East, Toronto, Ontario 2010
Nobu residences, Toronto, Ontario 2017

Commercial 
Bensimon Byrne Wellington, Toronto, Ontario, 2002

Awards

Queen's Diamond Jubilee Medal 
For outstanding contribution to Canadian culture and service to the Royal Canadian Academy of Arts

Canadian Governor General’s Awards for Architecture
1994, Trent University Childcare Centre
1997, Burt Matthews Hall Addition, University of Waterloo
2002, College of Engineering and Physical Science (addition to Albert Thornborough Building), University of Guelph
2008, Chemical Science Complex, Trent University
2008, Scarborough Chinese Baptist Church
2014, 60 Richmond East Housing Co-operative

Canadian Architect's Award 
1996, Centre for Environmental Science & Engineering, University of Guelph
1997, ESE Building, University of Waterloo
1999, Graduate Residence, University of Toronto
2004, New Academic Science Complex, Trent University
2005, Library and Classroom Building, Langara College
2007, 60 Richmond St. East Housing Development
2009, Sherbourne Common Pavilion

Canadian Wood Council Awards
1998, Squirrel`s Nest Childcare Centre

Alberta Architect's Association Awards
2010, Montrose Cultural Centre

Ontario Architect's Association Awards
1994, Trent University Childcare Centre
1997, Burt Matthews Hall Addition, University of Waterloo
2001, Honour Court and Entrance Gate, York University
2002, Graduate Residence, University of Toronto
2002, Eatonville Public Library (Honourable Mention)
2005, Early Learning Centre, University of Toronto (Bronze)
2005, Heathdale House (Honourable Mention)
2006, Chemical Science Complex, Trent University (Honourable Mention)
2007, Pachter Residence
2008, Scarborough Chinese Baptist Church
2010, 60 Richmond St. East Housing Development (Gold Standing)
2012, Sisters of St. Joseph Motherhouse
2012, Stephen Hawking Centre at the Perimeter Institute for Theoretical Physics
2014, County of Simcoe Administration Centre

City of Cambridge Urban Design Awards
2003, Preston Branch Library

City of Toronto Urban Design Awards
2000, Eglinton Spectrum Public School (Honourable Mention)
2003, Eatonville Public Library
2011, 60 Richmond St. East Housing Development
2011, Sherbourne Common Pavilion (Honourable Mention)
2021, SQ2 Condos & POPS

City of North York Urban Design Awards
1997, Glen Long Community Centre

City of Mississauga Urban Design Awards
1997, Mississauga Sailing Club
2009, Sherbourne Common Pavilion
2009, Mississauga Plastic Surgery Clinic

City of Scarborough Urban Design Awards
1995, Squirrel`s Nest Childcare Centre

Progressive Architecture Award
1999, Graduate Residence, University of Toronto

Holcim Awards
2005, Library and Classroom Building, Langara College

Plachta Prize for Architecture
1994, Trent University Childcare Centre
2001, Honour Court and Entrance Gate, York University
2007, Pachter Residence

SAB  Award 
2008, Langara College Library + Classroom Building
2010, 60 Richmond St. East Housing Development (Gold Standing)
2013, Simcoe County Administrative Building

Design Exchange Awards
2005, Early Learning Centre, University of Toronto (Bronze)
2005, Heathdale House (Honourable Mention)
2006, St. Joseph Media
2007, Pachter Residence
2010, 60 Richmond St. East Housing Development (Gold Standing)
2010, Langara Student Union (Honourable Mention)

PUG Awards
2010, 60 Richmond St. East Housing Development

Archdaily Building of the Year Awards
2011, 60 Richmond St. East Housing Development

References

External links

Official site

Architecture firms of Canada
Companies based in Toronto